Dabar Cave (Dabarska pećina; literally Beaver Cave) is located in the municipality of Sanski Most, Bosnia and Herzegovina. It is one of two sources of the river Dabar in the village of Donji Dabar. 

The cave is unexplored. Its exact length and depth are unknown. At the entrance to the cave, an enormous interior space opens. Farther into the cave is a lake,  which is really abundant during rainy and snowy periods. During heavy rainfall, a very large lake is created that prevents going deeper into the cave. The Dabar cave does not abound in cave decorations, stalactites and stalagmites. 

In scientific research several decades ago, a "human fish" was found in a lake located in the interior of a cave, an endemic species from prehistory that survived only in extremely clear waters and dark spaces. Archaeological research has revealed that the cave was inhabited in prehistoric times, since the objects that were used in daily lives by local inhabitants were found. Remains of the wooden settlement ("sojenica") were also found nearby and are believed to date from the Illyrian period.

References

External links 

 Zvanični sajt općine Sanski Most
 Zvanični sajt komisije nacionalnih spomenika Bosne i Hercegovine
Sanski Most

Coordinates on Wikidata
Caves of Bosnia and Herzegovina
Karst caves of Bosnia and Herzegovina
Karst formations of Bosnia and Herzegovina
Subterranean rivers of Bosnia and Herzegovina
Underground lakes of Bosnia and Herzegovina
Una (Sava) basin
Sana (river)
Karst springs of Bosnia and Herzegovina